The 1978 U.S. Open was the 78th U.S. Open, held June 15–18 at Cherry Hills Country Club in Cherry Hills Village, Colorado, a suburb south of Denver. Andy North held on for a one-stroke victory over runners-up Dave Stockton and J. C. Snead to claim the first of his two U.S. Open titles.

The strength in North's game was putting, and he needed only 114 putts over 72 holes, tying the record set by Billy Casper in 1966. This was North's second win on the PGA Tour, but he would not win again until the 1985 U.S. Open; of North's three career PGA Tour wins, two of them came at the U.S. Open.

This was the third U.S. Open at Cherry Hills, which previously hosted in 1938 and 1960. It was also the site of the PGA Championship in 1941, and later hosted in 1985.

Three players received special exemptions into the field. They were Billy Casper, Seve Ballesteros, and Arnold Palmer.

Forty-three golfers received an exemption from the qualifying process. The PGA Tour felt this was too few players. To protest, the PGA Tour staged the Buick Open the same week to compete with the U.S. Open.

Course layout

Source:

Lengths of the course for previous major championships:
, par 71 - 1960 U.S. Open
, par 71 - 1941 PGA Championship
, par 71 - 1938 U.S. Open

Past champions in the field

Made the cut

Missed the cut 

Source:

Round summaries

First round
Thursday, June 15, 1978

Second round
Friday, June 16, 1978

Amateurs: Clampett (+1), Holtgrieve (+8), Heafner (+9), Miller (+9), Edwards (+11), Choate (+16), Hodge (+17), Lewis (+21), Pomerantz (+25).

Third round
Saturday, June 17, 1978

Final round
Sunday, June 18, 1978

North began the final round with a one-stroke lead over Gary Player. Two months earlier, Player had won the Masters with a blistering 64 in the final round. History, however, would not repeat itself, as this time around Player struggled to a 77 (+6) and finished in a tie for 6th. North owned a four-shot lead over Snead heading to the back-nine, and after birdies at 11 and 13 he appeared to have the championship wrapped up. A bogey at 14, however, combined with a double-bogey at 15 and a birdie by Dave Stockton at the same hole dropped his lead to just one. Stockton, however, missed an 18-footer (5.5 m) for par at 18, increasing North's lead to two.

Snead had a chance for birdie at the last after his tee shot skipped off the water and onto the fairway, but he missed the birdie putt. Needing just a bogey at 18 to win, North's drive found the rough. He hit his second shot into the fairway, then his third found a greenside bunker. Needing to get up-and-down, he played his sand shot to five feet (1.5 m), and after backing off twice, sank the bogey putt for the one-stroke win.

Amateurs: Bobby Clampett (+13), Jim Holtgrieve (+20)

Scorecard
Final round

Cumulative tournament scores, relative to par

Source:

References

External links
USOpen.com – 1978
USGA Championship Database
Cherry Hills Country Club

U.S. Open (golf)
Golf in Colorado
Sports competitions in Denver
Englewood, Colorado
U.S. Open
U.S. Open (golf)
U.S. Open (golf)
U.S. Open (golf)
1970s in Denver